Idiocolpodes is a genus of ground beetles in the family Carabidae. This genus has a single species, Idiocolpodes tsaratanensis. It is found in Madagascar.

References

Platyninae